Utetheisa witti is a moth in the family Erebidae. It was described by Rob de Vos in 2007. It is found in the Philippine islands of Mindanao and Negros.

References

Moths described in 2007
witti